Alcatraz Versus the Scrivener's Bones is a juvenile fiction novel by Brandon Sanderson, published in November 2008 by Scholastic Press. It is preceded by Alcatraz Versus the Evil Librarians.

Plot summary
Alcatraz Versus the Scrivener's Bones is the second novel in the Alcatraz series. Sanderson continues the series as Alcatraz goes to the Library of Alexandria and tries to rescue his Dad and Grandpa from the soul stealing library curators. Once he arrives he is immediately separated from the rest of the group consisting of Bastille and her mother Draulin, Alcatraz's uncle Kazan, and Alcatraz's cousin Australia. Alcatraz is travelling through the library alone and he is often pestered by the curators who ask him to take a book at the cost of his soul. The curators speak long forgotten languages which he can understand because of his Translator's Lenses. At one point Alcatraz finds Bastille caught in a net, and he breaks the ropes that bind her. After Bastille and Alcatraz continue to venture Kazan finds them by utilizing his talent of getting lost. He finds them because they are both abstractly lost. Soon after the three travel the library with Kazan's talent they activate another trip wire which encloses them in a hardened goo. Alcatraz escapes by biting through it, and his friends follow suit. Along the way he finds the tomb of Alcatraz the first, who was the first wielder of the breaking talent. His tomb does not age because he broke time. At the tomb he also finds a note which informs him that his talent is more of a curse than a blessing. After activating yet a third trip wire Bastille and Alcatraz fall into a pit. After a lengthy (and awkward) discussion about responsibility, they escape using Windstormer's Lenses and proceed to fight the Scrivener's Bones—a sect of Dark Oculators. They defeat him by tricking him into checking out a book, then the curators take his soul. Later, they find Grandpa Smedry crying over a note. It is revealed that indeed, Attica Smedry (Alcatraz's father) has sold his soul for all the knowledge in the world. But, in claiming a note written before he was turned into a curator, Alcatraz learns of a way to turn him back.

Characters
Australia (Alcatraz's cousin), ever present Bastille, Draulin (Bastille's mother and knight of Crystallia), and Kazan, or Kaz as he is often called (Alcatraz's uncle), join in the fight against the Librarians. Kilimanjaro, a Scrivener's Bone (a sect of cyborg-like Librarians who replace parts of their bodies with Alivened technology), attempts to capture Alcatraz and his clan throughout the book. Floating around the Library are the always-present Curators of Alexandria, who will let you pick up any book in the Library - at the cost of your soul.

Smedry Talents
The new Talents are Australia's: waking up and looking incredibly ugly (useful as she wakes up looking like whoever, or whatever, she thought of last before she fell asleep) and Kazan, whose talent is getting lost (also very helpful, as he can 'get lost' whenever he is in a dangerous situation, and he 'finds his way back' when he deems it necessary). Each one helps Alcatraz as he wanders the rows of book shelves in the Library of Alexandria.
Also revealed is Alcatraz's father and mother's Talent of Losing Things.

Sequels
A third Alcatraz book was released October 1, 2009, titled Alcatraz Versus the Knights of Crystallia. A fourth book, Alcatraz Versus the Shattered Lens, was published in 2010. The final book in the series Alcatraz Versus the Dark Talent was published in 2016.

Film adaptations
DreamWorks Animation SKG acquired the film rights to Alcatraz Versus the Evil Librarians in June 2008.

Oculatory Lenses
In the books there are lenses that have special powers. Oculators are the only ones who have the ability to use the lenses. The lenses mentioned in the first two books in the series are:
 Oculator's Lenses, which highlight unusual objects and allow the wearer to see unusual things
 Firebringer's Lenses, which shoot heat rays
 Tracker's Lenses, which let the wearer see colored footprints of people (the longer you know a person or the closer their relation to you, the more brightly the prints appear and the longer the prints last)
 Shocker's Lenses, which cause people to pass out
 Translator's Lenses (a/k/a the Lenses of Rashid), which let the wearer read or write in any language or code
 Torturer's Lenses, which cause pain to any person the wearer focuses on
 Courier's Lenses, which carry messages to other oculators
 Windstomer's Lenses, which push things away with a gust of wind
 Voidstomer's Lenses, which uses low air pressure to pull things toward it
 Frostbringer's Lenses, which shoot a beam of icy frost
 Discerner's Lenses, which tell the wearer the relative age of an object
 Harrier's Lenses, which have a power not yet detailed at this point in the series
 Transcriber's Lenses, which have a power to translate other languages and make you understand different languages
 Truthfinders lens if the person is lying bugs will come out of there mouth if they are telling the truth mist will come out of there mouth    

Also mentioned is a method of making Lenses that can be used by non-Oculators; however, making these Lenses requires the blood of an Oculator obtained via sacrifice.

2007 American novels
American young adult novels
Alcatraz series